Constance McCready (born Constance Averill, August 20, 1921 – December 22, 2000), was an American journalist and politician from Portland, Oregon, in the United States.  She held several elected offices in Oregon during her career, including the Oregon House of Representatives, the Portland City Council, and culminating with a partial term as Portland's mayor. To date, McCready remains the last Republican to serve as mayor of the city.

Early life
She was born in Pendleton, Oregon on August 21, 1921, the daughter of conservationist Edgar Francis Averill. The family moved to Portland and she graduated from Grant High School. McCready graduated from the University of Oregon in 1943. After college she worked as a reporter for The Oregonian, Portland's main daily newspaper, later becoming the Home and Garden editor for the paper. In 1945, she married Albert L. McCready and the two had three daughters.

Politics
In 1967 and 1969, she served in the Oregon House of Representatives as a Republican representing Portland.

McCready was appointed to the Portland City Council in 1970, to fill a vacancy caused by the death of commissioner Stanley W. Earl, and was sworn in on March 19, 1970. She proceeded to serve as a commissioner (city council member) until 1979, being elected in 1972 and re-elected in 1976.

In 1979, by a vote of her fellow city commissioners, McCready was appointed to the position of mayor of Portland upon Neil Goldschmidt's resignation to become United States Secretary of Transportation in the Carter Administration.  She assumed office as mayor on September 5, 1979. She was the second of three women to hold the post. McCready was mayor during the 1980 eruption of Mount St. Helens when Portland was blanketed by ash on three occasions, and eventually threatened businesses with fines if they failed to remove the ash from their parking lots. She was defeated in the May 1980 primary by Frank Ivancie, whose succession to the office took effect on November 24, at which point McCready retired from politics.

A Republican, she was noted for her maverick political views which often deviated from the party line, including staunch support of the Equal Rights Amendment and gay rights.

McCready died in 2000 of complications from a stroke.

References

1921 births
2000 deaths
20th-century American non-fiction writers
Journalists from Oregon
Mayors of Portland, Oregon
Republican Party members of the Oregon House of Representatives
Politicians from Pendleton, Oregon
Portland City Council members (Oregon)
The Oregonian people
University of Oregon alumni
Women mayors of places in Oregon
Women state legislators in Oregon
20th-century American politicians
20th-century American women politicians
Women city councillors in Oregon
20th-century American journalists